Pahalat (also Romanized as Pāhalat, Pā ‘Allat, Pā‘elat, and Pāhlat) is a village in Veysian Rural District, Veysian District, Dowreh County, Lorestan Province, Iran. At the 2006 census, its population was 216, in 53 families.

References 

Towns and villages in Dowreh County